Hussein Mohamed Farrah Aidid (born August 16, 1962) is the son of General Mohamed Farrah Aidid.  His father was leader of the Somali National Alliance (SNA), the organization that fought US forces in Mogadishu, through his death on August 2, 1996, after being shot in a tribal battle. Farrah succeeded his father as leader of the SNA, and two days after his father's death, the SNA declared Farrah as the new President, although he too was not internationally recognized as such.  Farrah relinquished his claim as president in December 1997, by signing the Cairo Declaration, a significant step toward peace in Somalia.

Farrah is a veteran of the United States Marine Corps, having served during Desert Storm, serving in the US military from 1987–1995.

Early life
Born in Galkacyo, Farrah is a son of Mohamed Farrah Aidid and is sometimes known as Hussein Mohamed Farrah Aidid, Hussein Aidid or Aidid Junior. He emigrated to the United States when he was 17 years old, and attended Covina High School, Covina, California, graduating in 1981.

United States military service
In April 1987, Farrah enlisted in the United States Marine Corps Reserve. Following his training, he was assigned to the FDC, Fire Direction Control center, of Battery B of the 1st Battalion, 14th Marine Regiment at the Marine Corps reserve training center in Pico Rivera, California. He served during Operation Desert Storm when B 1/14 was mobilized in support of that war. He served in Somalia as an interpreter during Operation Restore Hope, having been chosen because he was the only United States Marine who spoke Somali.  Following his discharge, he remained in the United States and became a naturalized citizen.

Somali National Alliance (SNA)
When he turned 30 years old, Farrah was selected by the Habar Gidir clan as successor to his father and returned to Somalia. In the second half of the 1990s, different faction leaders vied for the Presidency, with none receiving international recognition. General Mohamed Farrah Aidid claimed to be President from June 15, 1995 to his death on August 1, 1996. Following this Hussein was sworn in as "interim President", and became leader of the Somali National Alliance (SNA), the same alliance his father led against the US forces. Farrah was seen by the West as a chance of improvement for the relationships between them and Somalia.

On September 1, 1996, Aidid met with UN representatives for the first time, to deal with issues left over as legacies of his father's administration. Issues addressed at the meeting which needed to be resolved before the return of UN workers and the resumption of UN assistance.

On December 17, 1996, rival warlord Ali Mahdi Mohamed attacked his headquarters, leaving 135 dead after five days of fighting in Mogadishu.

On December 22, 1997, he relinquished the disputed title of President by signing the Cairo Declaration, in Cairo, Egypt following a peace process between the Salbalar administration and the Soodare Group.

On March 30, 1998, Ali Mahdi Mohamed and Hussein Aidid signed a peace treaty in which they agreed to share power over Mogadishu, ending seven years of fighting following the ousting of Siad Barre.

On February 23, 1999, militiamen loyal to Aidid murdered 60 civilians in Baidoa and Daynunay.

Somali Reconciliation and Restoration Council (SRRC)

Hussein Aidid refused to recognize the newly forming Djibouti-backed Mogadishu-based Transitional Federal Government (TFG), accusing it of "harboring militant Islamist sympathizers." Instead he formed the rival Somali Reconciliation and Restoration Council (SRRC) in early 2001.

At some time during late 2001, he advised US President George W. Bush that a money transfer and telecommunications company, Al Barakaat, "had ties to terrorists and that there were terrorists in Somalia sympathetic to Osama bin Laden." He also "warned that militant Islamist Pakistani proselytizers were active in Mogadishu and other Somali cities and that they have strong links to Al-Itihaad al-Islamiya."

Transitional Federal Government (TFG)

Offices held:

Deputy Prime Minister (2005 – May 13, 2007)
Minister of the Interior (2005 – February 7, 2007)
Minister of Public Works and Housing (February 7, 2007 – December 2008)

In July 2003, at the Somali National Reconciliation Conference, the SRRC and TNG leadership reached key compromises: "The TNG accepted the number of parliamentarians proposed by the SRRC while the latter approved the inclusion of politicians as requested by the TNG."

On October 25, 2005, Aidid handed over the USC/SNA's combined 3,500 landmines to non-profit Geneva Call. He and other faction leaders had agreed to stop burying land mines as a further sign of the ending of years of civil war.

On December 28, 2006, after the defeat of the Islamic Courts Union (ICU), Aidid was present when government forces entered Mogadishu. On January 2, 2007, Aidid was quoted as suggesting Somalis in Ethiopia and Somalia should share a common passport, raising concerns of whether Somalia had plans to annex the Somali Region of Ethiopia.

On February 7, 2007, as part of Prime Minister Ali Mohamed Ghedi's cabinet reshuffling, he was moved from Minister of the Interior to Minister of Public Works and Housing.

On May 13, 2007, he was sacked from the position of deputy prime minister, with the reason being given that he was inactive in his duties. This followed Aidid's defection to Asmara, Eritrea, and his accusation that Ethiopia was guilty of "genocide" and calling for its withdrawal.

See also

Ali Mahdi Muhammad
Osman Ali Atto
Yusuf Mohammed Siad
Mohamed Afrah Qanyare

References

External links
Analysis: Somalia's powerbrokers
From Marine to warlord: The strange journey of Hussein Farrah Aidid

1962 births
Living people
American people of Somali descent
Members of the Transitional Federal Parliament
People from Greater Los Angeles
Somali National Alliance politicians
Somalian faction leaders
United States Marine Corps non-commissioned officers
Children of national leaders
People with acquired American citizenship
United States Marine Corps personnel of the Gulf War